The Heat Capacity Mapping Mission (HCMM) spacecraft was the first of a series of Applications Explorer Mission (AEM) of the Explorer program.

Mission 
The objective of the HCMM was to provide comprehensive, accurate, high-spatial-resolution thermal surveys of the surface of the Earth.

Spacecraft 
The HCMM spacecraft was made of two distinct modules: (1) an instrument module, containing the heat capacity mapping radiometer and its supporting gear, and (2) a base module, containing the data handling, power, communications, command, and attitude control subsystems required to support the instrument module. The spacecraft was spin stabilized at a rate of 14 rpm. The HCMM circular Sun-synchronous orbit allowed the spacecraft to sense surface temperatures near the maximum and minimum of the diurnal cycle. The orbit had a daylight ascending node with nominal equatorial crossing time of 14:00 hours. Since there was no inclination adjustment capacity, the spacecraft drifted from this crossing time by about 1 hour earlier per year. There was no on-board data storage capability, so only real-time data were transmitted when the satellite came within reception range of seven ground stations. The repeat cycle of the spacecraft was 16 days. Day/night coverage over a given area between the latitudes of 85°N and 85°S occurred at intervals ranging from 12 to 36 hours (once every 16 days).

Experiment

Heat Capacity Mapping Radiometer (HCMR) 
The objectives of the Heat Capacity Mapping Radiometer (HCMR) were (1) to produce thermal maps at the optimum times for making thermal-inertia studies for discrimination of rock types and mineral resources location, (2) to measure plant-canopy temperatures at frequent intervals to determine the transpiration of water and plant life, (3) to measure soil-moisture effects by observing the temperature cycle of soils, (4) to map thermal effluents, both natural and man-made, (5) to investigate the feasibility of geothermal source location by remote sensing, and (6) to provide frequent coverage of snow fields for water runoff prediction. The HCMR transmitted analog data in real time to selected receiving stations. The radiometer was similar to the surface composition mapping radiometer (SCMR) of Nimbus 5 (1972-097A). The HCMR had a small instantaneous geometric field of view of 0.83 mrad, high radiometric accuracy, and a wide  swath coverage on the ground so that selected areas were covered within the 12-hour period corresponding to the maximum and minimum of temperature observed. The instrument operated in two channels, 10.5 to 12.5 micrometers (IR) and 0.55 to 1.1 micrometers (visible). The instrument utilized a radiation cooler to cool the two Mercury cadmium telluride (|Hg-Cd-Te) detectors to 115 K. The experiment included an analog multiplexer that accepted the analog outputs of the detectors and multiplexed them in a form suitable for transmission by the spacecraft S-band transmitter. The instrument performed satisfactorily until the spacecraft operations terminated on 30 September 1980.

Launch 
HCMM was launched from Vandenberg Air Force Base on 26 April 1978 by a Scout D-1 launch vehicle.

End of mission and entry 
The operations of the spacecraft were terminated on 30 September 1980. HCMM re-entered in the Earth's atmosphere on 22 December 1981.

See also 

 Explorer program

References 

1978 in spaceflight
Explorers Program
Spacecraft launched in 1978